Datonglong tianzhenensis is an herbivorous ornithischian dinosaur belonging to the Hadrosauroidea, which lived in the Late Cretaceous period in present-day China. It is the type species of the genus Datonglong.

Discovery and naming
In 2008, a team from the Shanxi Museum of Geological and Mineral Science and Technology in the Kangdailiang quarry in Shanxi discovered the jaw of a euornithopod.

In 2016, the species Datonglong tianzhenensis was named and described by Xu Shicha, You Hailu, Wang Jiawei, Wang Suozhu, Yi Jian, and Jia Lei. The generic name refers to the city of Datong and the Chinese word long (龍), which means “dragon”. The specific name refers to its origins in Tianzhen county. Datonglong was one of eighteen dinosaur taxa from 2015 to be described in open access or free-to-read journals.

Description
The holotype, SXMG V 00005, consists of a portion of the lower jaw with some preserved teeth. The fossil was found in a layer of the Huiquanpu Formation. Though the exact time the fossil was deposited is unknown, it is believed to date from somewhere in the Cenomanian-Campanian timeframe, roughly 95 to 80 million years ago.

Datonglong was described as a new genus because of its unique dental structures. In the middle and back of the jaw are two functional teeth in each tooth position. Further, the main ridge of the tooth on the inner side is situated more to the back, while the secondary ridge is well developed. There are no further vertical ridges. The top of the tooth crown is bent slightly backwards.

The processus coronoides is vertically oriented. Teeth stand in groups of three or four in the tooth battery.

Classification
Datonglong is in the Hadrosauroidea clade, and is closely related to, but not part of, the Hadrosauridae family. However, this placement is not based on an exact cladistic analysis.

See also
2016 in paleontology

References

Hadrosaurs
Late Cretaceous dinosaurs of Asia
Fossil taxa described in 2016
Paleontology in Shanxi
Ornithischian genera